Petersburg West No. 16 Precinct is located in Menard County, Illinois, United States. The population was 2,299 at the 2000 census.

External links 
US Census
Illinois State Archives

Precincts in Menard County, Illinois
Springfield metropolitan area, Illinois